WLSD is a Classic Hits formatted broadcast radio station.  The station is licensed to Big Stone Gap, Virginia and serves the City of Norton and Wise County in Virginia.  WLSD is owned and operated by Valley Broadcasting and Communications, Inc.

History
WLSD first went on air August 20, 1953.  According to then-station manager William H. Wren, the call letters stood for the four counties served by WLSD: Wise-Lee-Scott-Dickenson.  On January 4, 2021, the format of the station was changed from Southern Gospel and Religious to Classic Hits branding as "92-5 The Vault".

Translator
In addition to WLSD's primary frequency, the station's programming is simulcast on the following translator station, on the FM band, to widen WLSD's broadcast area.

References

External links
 92-5 The Vault Online
 

1953 establishments in Virginia
Classic hits radio stations in the United States
Radio stations established in 1953
LSD
Wise County, Virginia